Pierre Ndaye Mulamba (4 November 1948 – 26 January 2019) was a football midfielder from the Democratic Republic of the Congo, formerly Zaire.  He was nicknamed "Mutumbula" ("assassin") and "Volvo".

Football career
Mulamba was born in Luluabourg (now Kananga) in 1948. In 1973, he starred for AS Vita Club of Kinshasa, who won the African Cup of Champions Clubs. He was a second-half substitute for the Zaire national team against Morocco in the decisive match in qualification for the 1974 World Cup. In 1974 Mulamba played for Zaire in both the African Cup of Nations in Egypt and the World Cup in West Germany. In Egypt he scored nine goals, still a record, as Zaire won the tournament. Mulamba was named Player of the Tournament and was awarded the National Order of the Leopard by President Mobutu Sese Seko. In Germany he captained the team, and played in the 2–0 defeat by Scotland, but was sent off after 22 minutes against Yugoslavia. Zaire were already losing 4–0 by then, and finally lost 9–0. Mulamba said later that the team had underperformed, either in protest or from loss of morale, after not receiving a promised $45,000 match bonus.

Later life
In 1994, Mulamba was honoured at the African Cup of Nations in Tunisia. On returning to Zaire, he was shot in the leg by robbers who mistakenly assumed a former sports star would be a wealthy target. He was sheltered by Emmanuel Paye-Paye for eight months' recuperation. During the First Congo War, Mulamba's eldest son was killed and in 1996 he fled to South Africa as a refugee, alone and destitute. He went to Johannesburg and then Cape Town, where he was taken in by a family in a township. In 1998, a minute's silence was held at the African Cup of Nations in Burkina Faso after an erroneous report that Mulamba had died in a diamond mining accident in Angola. By then Mulamba was unemployed and drinking heavily.

By 2010 Mulamba was working as a coach of local amateur teams and had married a local woman. Forgotten Gold, a documentary filmed in 2008–09, follows him in South Africa and on a visit back to Congo. He also met with Danny Jordaan, head of the organising committee for the 2010 FIFA World Cup.

Mulamba suffered from heart, kidney and knee problems in later life and was a wheelchair user. He lived in poverty and without recognition in the Khayelitsha township of Cape Town. He died in Johannesburg on 26 January 2019.

Honours
AS Vita Club
 African Cup of Champions Clubs: 1973
 Zaire / DR Congo League (6): 1972, 1973, 1975, 1977, 1980, 1988
 Congo Cup (7): 1972, 1973, 1975, 1977, 1981, 1982, 1983
Zaire
 Africa Cup of Nations: 1974

References

External links
 
 
 Biography [translated from french]

1948 births
2019 deaths
People from Kananga
AS Vita Club players
Africa Cup of Nations-winning players
Association football midfielders
Democratic Republic of the Congo footballers
Democratic Republic of the Congo international footballers
1974 FIFA World Cup players
1974 African Cup of Nations players
1976 African Cup of Nations players
Democratic Republic of the Congo emigrants to South Africa